Hoa Thủy is a commune (xã) Lệ Thủy District, Quảng Bình Province, Vietnam. Local economy is mainly agricultural, rice production and cattle breeding. It is served by My Duc Railway Station on Hanoi–Saigon Railway, 26 km south of Đồng Hới Railway Station.

Communes of Quảng Bình province